Located in Northampton, Massachusetts, Campus School of Smith College is a private elementary lab school that enrolls students from surrounding nearby communities through grades K-6. While their school year lasts from early September until May, the school provides after-school programs as well as a June program the students can enroll in.

History
The Campus School of Smith College was founded in 1926 by the president of Smith College, Jim Carry who first established The Smith College Nursery School and The Smith College Day School, later renamed Smith College Campus School. In 2018, the school name changed to Campus School of Smith College, or Campus School for short. The school then expanded to the laundry building at Smith.

References

Educational institutions established in 1926
Private elementary schools in Massachusetts
Smith College
University-affiliated schools in the United States
1926 establishments in Massachusetts